James Badrian (8 June 1940 – 30 July 1979) was a Rhodesian boxer. He competed in the men's flyweight event at the 1960 Summer Olympics, representing Rhodesia. At the 1960 Summer Olympics, he lost to Ezaria Ilkhanoff of Iran.

References

External links
 

1940 births
1979 deaths
Flyweight boxers
Rhodesian male boxers
South African male boxers
Olympic boxers of Rhodesia
Boxers at the 1960 Summer Olympics
Boxers from Johannesburg
South African emigrants to Rhodesia